A by-election was held for the New South Wales Legislative Assembly electorate of Gordon on 7 August 1937 because of the resignation of Sir Philip Goldfinch.

Dates

Result

 

The by-election was caused by resignation of Sir Philip Goldfinch.

See also
Electoral results for the district of Gordon
List of New South Wales state by-elections

References

1937 elections in Australia
New South Wales state by-elections
1930s in New South Wales